"No War but the Class War" (NWBTCW or NWBCW) is a motto expressing opposition to capitalism used by anarchist and communist groups. It is also the name for a number of anti-authoritarian and anti-capitalist groups.

Group names 
The first two NWBTCW groups appeared in London during the 1990–1991 Gulf War and the 1999 Kosovo War. Both groups, which included ex-members of the London-based Class War, dissolved after the respective war they were protesting stopped. The third NWBTCW group appeared in London following the start of the War in Afghanistan in October 2001. Efforts, particularly by the Communist Workers' Organisation, to turn this into a network of groups across Britain failed. A split in the group which was characterised as between theory and practice led to the 'actionists' leaving to form the Disobedients, whose activities included an attempt to occupy Old Street Roundabout along with Critical Mass which was swamped by police much like all the other actions by this group. The 'theorist' section transmuted itself into the No War but the Class War Discussion Group, which eventually also dissolved.

As a slogan 
As a slogan, "No War but the Class War" has been used by people not necessarily linked to any of the above groups. It is widely used by diverse Marxist groups as a means of underlining the priority of class struggle above other political aims and as a general anti-militarist slogan.

The phrase was used in the first episode of the 1975 series Days of Hope, written by Jim Allen and directed by Ken Loach (both socialists), which caused controversy in Britain over its portrayal of the British military during World War I. A socialist who has deserted from the British army says, "I'm no pacifist. I'll fight in a war, but I'll fight in the only war that counts, and that's the class war, and it'll come when all this lot's over."

See also
Eat the rich

Notes

External links 
 No War but the Class War – archive of texts by the various London NWBTCW groups.
 The story of this group (in its various incarnations) – article by the third NWBTCW group, looking at the history and limitations of the group.
 No war but the class war: remembering and reflecting 10 years after – reflective analysis on the first NWBTCW group by a former member.

Anarchist organisations in the United Kingdom
Anti-capitalism
Political catchphrases
Anti-war movement